Jack London is an Australian men's fashion label founded in 2008. Part of the Factory X group of brands including Alannah Hill, Gorman and Dangerfield, Jack London had a number of stores across Australia, as well as concession stores in select Myer department stores. Jack London is not named after the American author Jack London, but rather the name comes from the brand's desire to emulate the London designers of the 1960s.

All physical retail stores closed in August 2021, and the brand now operates purely online  to facilitate a final liquidation sale.

References

External links

2008 establishments in Australia
Clothing companies established in 2008
Companies based in Melbourne
Clothing companies of Australia